Bedrock City is a Flintstones-themed roadside attraction consisting of an amusement park and RV park at the corner of Arizona State Route 64 and U.S. Route 180 in Coconino County, in the U.S. state of Arizona. The park was opened in 1972, following the owners' success with a predecessor park near Mount Rushmore in South Dakota. The park licenses the likenesses of the Flintstones characters, and features statues, rides, and a diner based on that theme.

In 2015, the park's owner, Linda Speckles, was planning to retire and sell the park for $2 million US. The park was closed on January 28, 2019, but reopened in mid-June and remained open through the end of Summer 2019. As of the location's 50th anniversary in 2022, it has been incorporated as part of the Raptor Ranch conservation park, with plans to remain open "indefinitely."

Further reading

References

Amusement parks in Arizona
The Flintstones in amusement parks
1972 establishments in Arizona
2019 disestablishments in Arizona
Defunct amusement parks in the United States
Buildings and structures completed in 1972
Buildings and structures demolished in 2019
Hanna-Barbera in amusement parks
Demolished buildings and structures in Arizona